Umair Khan (born 31 July 1985) is a Pakistani cricketer who plays for United Bank Limited. He has played in more than 100 first-class cricket matches since 2007.

References

External links
 

1985 births
Living people
Pakistani cricketers
Pakistan Television cricketers
United Bank Limited cricketers
People from Kohat District
Islamabad cricketers
Federal Areas cricketers
State Bank of Pakistan cricketers